KOAM-TV (channel 7) is a television station licensed to Pittsburg, Kansas, United States, serving the Joplin, Missouri–Pittsburg, Kansas market as an affiliate of CBS. It is owned by Morgan Murphy Media, which provides certain services to dual Fox/CW+ affiliate KFJX (channel 14, also licensed to Pittsburg) under joint sales and shared services agreements (JSA/SSA) with owner SagamoreHill Broadcasting. The two stations share studios and transmitter facilities on US 69 south of Pittsburg, with a secondary studio and news bureau on South Range Line Road in Joplin.

History
KOAM-TV first signed on at 5:22 p.m. on December 13, 1953 under the ownership of MidContinent Broadcasting Company, a joint venture of The Joplin Globe newspaper and E. Victor Baxter and Lester Cox, owners of KOAM radio (860 AM, the current KKOW), with Baxter and Cox holding a controlling interest.  The Globe would eventually sell its minority stake in the station to Baxter and Cox.

KOAM-TV launched as a primary affiliate of NBC, owing to KOAM radio's long affiliation with NBC Radio, though it also had secondary affiliations with CBS (until KSWM-TV launched in 1954), DuMont (until that network's 1956 closure) and ABC (until January 1968, when KODE became a full-time ABC affiliate and KUHI-TV signed on with CBS). On September 5, 1982, KOAM swapped affiliations with KTVJ (the former KUHI-TV and now known as KSNF) and became a CBS affiliate. Mid-Continent Broadcasting sold the station to Draper Communications, who also owned WBOC-TV in Salisbury, Maryland in 1984. Draper then sold it to KOAM Ltd. Partnership in 1987.

KOAM's digital signal on channel 13 signed on in 2001 and remained until KOAM turned off its analog signal at 12:38 a.m. on February 17, 2009 (the original date in which full-power television stations in the United States were to transition from analog to digital broadcasts under federal mandate, which was later pushed back to June 12, 2009) following The Late Late Show with Craig Ferguson, at which time KOAM ceased analog broadcasting and its digital broadcast returned to channel 7. Sister station KFJX, the market's Fox affiliate, moved onto KOAM's former digital channel 13 (KFJX continued to broadcast on analog channel 14 until May 2009 when a line of severe thunderstorms damaged the broadcast tower, forcing the removal of the antenna). KFJX's signal is simulcast in high definition on KOAM's digital subchannel 7.2.

In June 2010, the DirecTV satellite system added Joplin locals to its channel line-up. Initially, KOAM and sister station KFJX refused to allow DirecTV to carry their stations. In February 2012, KOAM and KFJX began airing on DirecTV.

On May 10, 2017, Morgan Murphy Media announced that it would acquire Saga Communications' television clusters in Joplin, Missouri, including KOAM-TV, and Victoria, Texas, including KAVU-TV. The sale was completed on September 1.

It was announced on March 24, 2022 that both KOAM-TV and KFJX-TV were approved to increase their power. The KOAM power will be increased from 14.8 kilowatts to 98.8 kilowatts and the power for KFJX will be increased from 5.6 kilowatts to 45.1 kilowatts. The project will also add vertical polarization. They will both temporarily broadcast at a lower power while construction is being completed.

On June 20, 2022, KOAM and KFJX started broadcasting at a lower height of 760 feet and a lower power output in preparation to have their new transmitters installed by the end of June or early July.

On July 9, 2022, KOAM and KFJX started broadcasting on their brand new transmitters with a higher power output than before.

Programming
In addition to the CBS network schedule, syndicated programming on KOAM includes Wheel of Fortune, Dr. Phil, The Game, Judge Mathis, and Judge Judy.
 
Wheel of Fortunes sister show, Jeopardy!, airs on KODE (at 3:30 p.m.) and KSNF (at 5 p.m.), making Joplin–Pittsburg one of only a few markets where the programs are carried on separate stations (normally, both shows air on the same channel back-to-back).

News operation
KOAM presently broadcasts 21½ hours of locally produced newscasts each week (with four hours each weekday, one hour on Saturdays and a half-hour on Sundays).

Notable former on-air staff
 Brian Williams (NBC Nightly News anchor from 2004 to 2015)

Subchannels
The station's digital signal is multiplexed:

In September 2019, KOAM added MeTV to the DT3 subchannel as the Joplin–Pittsburg market did not have a MeTV affiliate.

References

External links
Official website

Morgan Murphy Media stations
Television stations in Kansas
OAM-TV
CBS network affiliates
Television channels and stations established in 1953
1953 establishments in Kansas
Pittsburg, Kansas